Perennibranchiate, in zoology, is the condition of an organism retaining branchae, or gills, through life. This condition is generally said of certain amphibia, such as the mudpuppy. The term is opposed to caducibranchiate. In some cases only a small proportion of a given amphibian population is perennibranchiate, but in other instances a preponderance of the individuals have an adult gill retention. For example, in the case of the Rough-skinned Newt in the Cascade Mountains populations, approximately ninety percent of the adult population is perennibranchiate.

See also
 Neoteny

References
 William Benjamin Carpenter (1854) Principles of Comparative Physiology, Published by Blanchard and Lea, 752 pages
 C. Michael Hogan (2008) Rough-skinned Newt (Taricha granulosa), Globaltwitcher, ed. Nicklas Stromberg

Line notes

Amphibians